Căuaș is a commune of 2,350 inhabitants situated in Satu Mare County, Crișana, Romania. It is composed of six villages:

Ady Endre / Érmindszent or Adyfalva
Căuaș
Ghenci / Gencs
Ghilești / Illéd
Hotoan / Érhatvan
Rădulești / Újtanya

Demographics
Ethnic groups (2011 census): 
Romanians: (46.7%)
Hungarians: (35.1%)
Roma: (17.9%)

History
In July 2011, a Thracian settlement dating to 1050–1750 BC has been discovered in Căuaș by a joint research group formed by Romanian and German archaeologists.

Ady Endre Memorial House
Three kilometres from Căuaș there is a small village with the name of the poet Endre Ady, one of the most important Hungarian poets. In 1957, the Ady Endre Memorial House was founded and in the same year the name of the small village Mecențiu was changed to Ady Endre. Among the important documents, books, and manuscripts, there is also the parish transcript of the Protestant Church with the registered birth date of the poet in it. In the opposite part of the courtyard there is the Ady Endre family peasant house, where the original furniture items are displayed.

Notes

External links

 Thracian settlement discovered in Căuaș 

 

Communes in Satu Mare County
Localities in Crișana